Joseph Gordon Lamb (June 18, 1906 – August 21, 1982) was a professional ice hockey forward who played 11 seasons in the National Hockey League with the Montreal Maroons, Ottawa Senators, New York Americans, Boston Bruins, Montreal Canadiens, St. Louis Eagles and Detroit Red Wings. He is one of only six NHL players to have worn the number 99.

Career statistics

Regular season and playoffs

References

External links

1906 births
1982 deaths
Boston Bruins players
Canadian ice hockey right wingers
Detroit Red Wings players
Ice hockey people from New Brunswick
Montreal Canadiens players
Montreal Maroons players
New York Americans players
Ottawa Senators (1917) players
Ottawa Senators (original) players
People from Kings County, New Brunswick
Pittsburgh Hornets players
St. Louis Eagles players